October 23 - Eastern Orthodox liturgical calendar - October 25

All fixed commemorations below celebrated on November 6 by Eastern Orthodox Churches on the Old Calendar.

For October 24th, Orthodox Churches on the Old Calendar commemorate the Saints listed on October 11.

Saints
 Martyr Sebastiani (1st century)
 Martyrs Sotiricus and Valentinos, from Asia Minor, by being dragged over sharp stones.
 Hieromartyr Akakios the Presbyter, by the sword.
 Martyr Nerdonus, by fire. 
 Saint Proclus of Constantinople, Archbishop of Constantinople (447)
 Great-martyr Arethas of Omir and 4,299 martyrs with him, including Martyr Syncletica and her two daughters (523) 
 A holy woman martyr and her child, together with Martyr Arethas of Omir and his companions (523)
 Blessed Elesbaan (Caleb), King of Ethiopia (553-555)

Pre-Schism Western saints
 Martyrs Felix (Africanus), Audactus (Adauctus), Januarius, Fortunatus and Septimus (303) 
 Saint Evergislus (Ebregesilus, Eberigisil), a Bishop of Cologne in Germany, martyred by heathen robbers (5th century) 
 Saint Maglorius of Sark (Maelor), Bishop of Dol-de-Bretagne in Brittany (575) 
 Saint Senoch the Healer, Abbot, of Tours, Gaul (576)
 Saint Cadfarch, a disciple of St Iltyd, he founded churches in Penegoes and Abererch in Wales (6th century)
 Saint Martin of Vertou, founder of the monastery of Vertou near Nantes, also of Saint-Jouin-de-Marnes and other monasteries (601)
 Saint Marcius (Mark, Martin), a hermit at Montecassino in Italy (c. 679) 
 Saint Fromundus (Frodemundus), Monk, Abbot and then Bishop of Coutances in France (c. 690)

Post-Schism Orthodox saints
 Venerable Arethas, recluse, of the Kiev Caves (1190) 
 Venerable Sisoes of the Kiev Caves (13th century)
 Venerable Theophilus the Silent, of the Kiev Caves (12th-13th century)
 Saint Athanasius I of Constantinople, Patriarch of Constantinople (1311)  (see also: October 28)
 Saint John, recluse, of the Pskov Caves (1616)
 Venerable Zosima (Verkhovsky), Elder, of Siberia (1833) 
 Saint George the New Confessor, of Drama, Greece (1959)  (see also: November 4 - Greek)

New Martys and Confessors
 New Hieromartyr Lawrence (Knyazev), Bishop of Balakhnin, and Alexis Porfiriev, Archpriest, and with them New Martyr Alexis Neidhardt (1918)
 New Hieromartyr Arethas (Mitrenin), Hieromonk of Valaam (1932),
 New Hieromartyrs John Smirnov and Nicholas Nikolsky, Priests (1937)
 New Martyr Peter Bogorodsky, Priest (1938)

Other commemorations
 Icon of the Most Holy Theotokos The "Joy of All Who Sorrow" (Moscow) (1688)
 Repose of Blessed Eudocia of Ryazan (1890) 
 Repose of Hieroschemamonk Barsanuphius of Valaam (1910)

Icon gallery

Notes

References

Sources
 October 24 / November 6. Orthodox Calendar (PRAVOSLAVIE.RU).
 November 6 / October 24. HOLY TRINITY RUSSIAN ORTHODOX CHURCH (A parish of the Patriarchate of Moscow).
 October 24. OCA - The Lives of the Saints.
 The Autonomous Orthodox Metropolia of Western Europe and the Americas (ROCOR). St. Hilarion Calendar of Saints for the year of our Lord 2004. St. Hilarion Press (Austin, TX). p. 79.
 The Twenty-Fourth Day of the Month of October. Orthodoxy in China.
 October 24. Latin Saints of the Orthodox Patriarchate of Rome.
 The Roman Martyrology. Transl. by the Archbishop of Baltimore. Last Edition, According to the Copy Printed at Rome in 1914. Revised Edition, with the Imprimatur of His Eminence Cardinal Gibbons. Baltimore: John Murphy Company, 1916. p. 328.
 Rev. Richard Stanton. A Menology of England and Wales, or, Brief Memorials of the Ancient British and English Saints Arranged According to the Calendar, Together with the Martyrs of the 16th and 17th Centuries. London: Burns & Oates, 1892. pp. 512–513.
Greek Sources
 Great Synaxaristes:  24 ΟΚΤΩΒΡΙΟΥ. ΜΕΓΑΣ ΣΥΝΑΞΑΡΙΣΤΗΣ.
  Συναξαριστής. 24 Οκτωβρίου. ECCLESIA.GR. (H ΕΚΚΛΗΣΙΑ ΤΗΣ ΕΛΛΑΔΟΣ).
  24/10/2017. Ορθόδοξος Συναξαριστής. 
Russian Sources
  6 ноября (24 октября). Православная Энциклопедия под редакцией Патриарха Московского и всея Руси Кирилла (электронная версия). (Orthodox Encyclopedia - Pravenc.ru).
  24 октября по старому стилю / 6 ноября по новому стилю. Русская Православная Церковь - Православный церковный календарь на 2016 год.

October in the Eastern Orthodox calendar